Aberdeen Lake is a large, irregularly shaped lake in Kivalliq Region, Nunavut, Canada. It is located on the Canadian Shield. The Thelon Wildlife Sanctuary is to the west.

The Thelon River is the lake's primary inflow and outflow. Beverly Lake and Schultz Lake are nearby.

See also
List of lakes of Nunavut
List of lakes of Canada

References

Lakes of Kivalliq Region